The 2010 AFC U-19 Championship was an international under-19 age group football tournament held in China from 3 – 17 October 2010. The sixteen national teams involved in the tournament were required to register a squad of maximum 23 players; only players in these squads were eligible to take part in the tournament.

The age listed for each player is on 3 October 2010, the first day of the tournament. The nationality for each club reflects the national association (not the league) to which the club is affiliated. A flag is included for coaches that are of a different nationality than their own national team. Players in boldface have been capped at full international level at some point in their career.

Group A

China PR
Head coach: Su Maozhen

The final squad was announced on 29 September 2010.

Saudi Arabia
Head coach: Khalid Al-Koroni

Syria
Head coach: Kevork Mardikian

Thailand
Head coach: Chalermwoot Sa-ngapol

Group B

Uzbekistan
Head coach: Marat Kabaev

The final squad was announced on 28 September 2010.

North Korea
Head coach: Yun Jong-su

Bahrain
Head coach:  Hosni Zouaoui

The final squad was announced on 28 September 2010.

Iraq
Head coach: Hassan Ahmed

Group C

Japan
Head coach: Keiichiro Nuno

The final squad was announced on 22 September 2010.

United Arab Emirates
Head coach: Juma Rabeeh Mubarak

Vietnam
Head coach: Triệu Quang Hà

The preliminary squad was announced on 27 August 2010.

Jordan
Head coach:  Mohamed Azima

Group D

Australia
Head coach:  Jan Versleijen

The final squad was announced on 21 September 2010.

South Korea
Head coach: Lee Kwang-jong

The final squad was announced on 27 September 2010.

Iran
Head coach: Ali Doustimehr

The final squad was announced on 18 September 2010.

Yemen
Head coach: Sami Hasan Al Nash

References

External links
, the-AFC.com

Squads